Nate Leaman (born November 27, 1972) is an American ice hockey coach. He is currently the head coach for Providence. He was previously head coach at Union.

Career

Leaman grew up in Centerville, Ohio, not playing hockey until he was a teenager. He attended SUNY Cortland, where he played on the hockey team, and graduated in 1997. He was inducted into the Cortland C-Club Hall of Fame in September 2014.

After Mark Mazzoleni resigned as Harvard head coach in June 2004, Leaman was reported to be considered for the position. However, he announced that he would not pursue the Harvard job and remain at Union.

Leaman was named ECAC Coach of the Year for the 2009–10 season and the 2010–11 season. He also won the Spencer Penrose Award for the 2010–11 season.

In April 2011, Leaman was hired to coach the Providence Friars. In September 2013, Leaman signed a contract extension with Providence through the 2020–21 season.

In 2014–15, after leading Providence to winning the national championship, Leaman was named USCHO Coach of the Year.

On January 5, 2021, as the Head Coach for Team USA's National Junior Team at the 2021 IIHF World Junior Championship in Edmonton, Canada, Leaman guided the team to the gold medal with a 2-0 shutout victory over host country Canada.

Head coaching record

References

External links
Providence bio
USCHO bio

1972 births
Living people
State University of New York at Cortland alumni
American ice hockey coaches
Union Dutchmen ice hockey coaches
Providence Friars men's ice hockey players